Push Protocol formerly known as EPNS (Ethereum Push Notification Services) is a decentralized communication protocol for the blockchains.Push Protocol enables cross-chain notifications and messaging for dapps, wallets, and services.

History 
Push Protocol was founded by Richa Joshi and Harsh Rajat in 2020

In April 2022, Push Protocol raised $10 Million funding led by Jump, Tiger Global and others

References 

Blockchains
Cross-platform software